The Lords of Van Brederode (Heeren van Brederode) were a noble family from Holland who played an important role during the Middle Ages and the Early modern period. The family had a high noble rank and hold the titles Count of Brederode, Count of Gennep, and furthermore they ruled the souverain Lordship of Vianen, the Viscountship of Utrecht among other feudal titles.

History
The Lords of Brederode descendant from the Counts of Holland and the powerful Van Teylingen family (see Slot Teylingen, about halfway between Haarlem and Leiden). Dirk I van Brederode, also called Dirk van Teylingen, built the Brederode castle. The earliest documented members appear in the 13th century in the region of Santpoort, at Castle Brederode.

The lords of Brederode already had enormous influence in the 13th century. Their partisanship with John of Avesnes, Count of Holland was not without importance, but it increased when the dispute between the Hoeks and the Cods broke out in 1350. The Brederode were the hereditary leaders of the Hoeks, the noble party, and the Van Arkels and Egmonds, the rival dynasties, their opponents.

Walraven I van Brederode (1370–1417) acquired the title of Count of Gennep and the sovereign rule of Vianen. His son Reinoud II van Brederode (1415–1473) became hereditary burgrave of the city of Utrecht. The Brederodes, high-spirited due to their constantly growing possessions, their high reputation and their almost princely dignity, were always characterized by their pride. Reinouds II grandson Reinoud III van Brederode claimed the county of Holland under Charles V and was thus deprived of his dignity and property as a high traitor. But since his claims never had any real weight, he got them back from the emperor. Reinouds III second son was Hendrick, count of Brederode (1531-1568), the leader of the allied Dutch nobles, the so-called Compromis des Nobles of 1566 and the Geuzen. During the Protestant Reformation the Van Brederode family left Holland and their properties were confiscated by the government. Their descendants sued the government, but when the decision came in their favor the main family line had died out in 1679 with Wolfert van Brederode (1649-1679), son of Jan Wolfart van Brederode (1599-1655), Field Marshal of the Republic of the United Netherlands. The debt to the unknown heirs is still on the Netherlands State Budget ("Nederlandse staatsbegroting"). Currently the Dutch monarch is entitled to the interest of the capital (Queen Wilhelmina was the first to be entitled to this money). In 1967 the sum was said to be around 3.000 million Dutch guilders.

Other Brederodes 
The Van der Duyn family, later raised to the rank of count, also descended from the Lords of Brederode. An illegitimate line, Heeren von Bolswaert, who held the title "Reichsgraf von Brederode" (Imperial Count) continued until 1832. Furthermore, it is said that there is still a non-noble line of the Brederode family today. This family claim that their roots goes back to Dirk Walravensz van Brederode, who was later declared the legitimate son of Walraven van Brederode († 1369), the younger brother of Reinoud I van Brederode.

Heraldry
The coat of arms of the family is depicted in the medieval Gelre Armorial (folio 83r).

Family tree
 William van Teylingen (1156–1203)
 Dirk I van Brederode (1180–1236) m. Alveradis van Heusden 
 William I van Brederode (1236–1285) m. Hildegonde van Voorne d.1302 
 Dirk II van Brederode (1252–1318) m. Maria van der Lecke
 Katharina van Brederode (-1372) m. John I, Lord of Polanen 
 William II van Brederode (-1316) m. Elisabeth von Kleve
 Dirk III van Brederode (1308–1377) m. Beatrix van Valkenburg  d.1354
Reinoud I van Brederode (1336–1390) m. Johanna van Gennep d.1413
 Jan I van Brederode (1370/72–1415)
 Walraven I van Brederode (1370/73–1417) m.  Johanna van Vianen en Ameide  d. 1418
 Reinoud II van Brederode (1415–1473) m. Yolanthe de Lalaing  d. 1497
 Walraven II van Brederode (1455–1531) m. Margaretha van Borselen d. 1507
 Reinoud III van Brederode (15??–1584) m. Philippine von der Marck, d. 1539 
 Hendrick van Brederode (1531–1568) m. Amalia von Neuenahr  d.1602
 Wolfert van Brederode (1495-1548) m.  Adriana Back van Asten
 Reinoud IV van Brederode (1520–1584)m. Margaretha van Doorne
 Walraven III van Brederode (1547–1614) m. Gulielma van Haeften
 Floris van Brederode (-1599) m. Dorothea van Haeften
 Walraven IV van Brederode (1596–1620)
 Joan Wolfert van Brederode (1599–1655)m.1 Anne Joanne of Nassau-Siegen (1594-1636) m.2 Louise Christina zu Solms-Braunfels  (1606-1669)
 Amalia Margaretha van Brederode (1625-1663)
 Frans van Brederode (1465-1490)
Gijsbrecht van Brederode (1416-1475)
William van Brederode (1380-1451)

See also
Castle Brederode

Literature
 Detlev Schwennicke, Europäische Stammtafeln Band XVIII (2012) Tafel 39–40.

Notes

 
Dutch noble families
People from Velsen